Dennis Flores Cortés (born September 23, 1993) is an American soccer player who currently plays for Cal FC.

Early life
Flores was born in Pasadena, California.  He is an American of Mexican descent.

Career

Playing for local clubs in California including U.S. Soccer Development Academy member Arsenal FC, Flores was encouraged to try out with Alianza de Futbol Hispano, an organization that gears to develop Hispanic soccer at the amateur level.  Through Alianza de Futbol Hispano, Flores was able to display his game to scouts from various Mexican clubs.  After impressing on a two-week trial with Club León of Liga MX, Flores signed a professional contract.

Professional
Flores made his professional league debut with León on March 8, 2014 as a substitute against Veracruz.

In 2018, he played with PDL club FC Golden State Force.

International
In August 2014, he debuted for the United States U23 against the Bahamas senior team, scoring one goal in a 5-1 victory.

Flores earned his first callup to the United States national team in January 2015.

References

External links
 
 
 

1993 births
Living people
American soccer players
American sportspeople of Mexican descent
Club León footballers
Soccer players from California
Liga MX players
American expatriate sportspeople in Mexico
United States men's under-23 international soccer players
Sportspeople from Pasadena, California
Association football midfielders
FC Golden State Force players
Cal FC players